(also known as "Puerto Rican syndrome") is a psychological syndrome mostly associated, in the United States, with Spanish-speaking people from the Caribbean, although commonly identified among all Iberian-descended cultures.  translates into English as "attack of nerves", although it is used in its common cultural form to refer to a specific pattern of symptoms, rather than being a general term for feeling nervous. The condition appears in Appendix I of the revised fourth edition of the Diagnostic and Statistical Manual of Mental Disorders (DSM-IV-TR) as a culture-bound syndrome.

Classification
Despite comparisons to panic attacks, investigators have identified  as a separate syndrome with measured differences in anxiety sensitivity, and types of attacks. Marlene Steinberg, an Associate Research Scientist at Yale University stated that because it is similar to Multiple Personality Disorder, some Hispanics may be misdiagnosed with an  syndrome instead.

Symptoms
Reported aspects of the syndrome include uncontrollable screaming or shouting, crying, trembling, sensations of heat rising in the chest and head, dissociative experiences, and verbal or physical aggression. The reaction is usually associated with a stressful event relating to the family, although it is not specifically defined as arising from such occurrences.

History 
 was first mentioned after studies were conducted by US psychiatrists who focused on healthcare for Hispanic populations, particularly individuals who were Puerto Rican and living in the United States .

See also
 Dissociative identity disorder
 Nervous breakdown
 Susto
Women on the Verge of a Nervous Breakdown
 Hwabyeong
 Posttraumatic stress disorder

References

Culture-bound syndromes
Medical anthropology
Latin American culture